SM UB-84 was a German Type UB III submarine or U-boat in the German Imperial Navy during World War I. She was commissioned into the German Imperial Navy on 31 October 1917 as SM UB-84.

She was later raised and used as a training boat. On 26 November 1918 she was surrendered to the French in accordance with the requirements of the Armistice with Germany and broken up in Brest in 1921.

Construction

She was built by AG Weser of Bremen and following just under a year of construction, launched at Bremen on 3 October 1917. UB-84 was commissioned later that same year under the command of Kptlt. Max Bräutigam. Like all Type UB III submarines, UB-84 carried 10 torpedoes and was armed with a  deck gun. UB-84 had a displacement of  while surfaced and  when submerged. Her engines enabled her to travel at  when surfaced and  when submerged.

References

Notes

Citations

Bibliography 

 

German Type UB III submarines
World War I submarines of Germany
U-boats commissioned in 1917
1917 ships
Ships built in Bremen (state)
U-boats sunk in 1917
U-boats sunk in collisions